The Costen House is a historic U.S. home located at 206 Market Street, Pocomoke City, Maryland, United States. Dr. Isaac Thomas Costen built the house c. 1870s and members of his family lived there for over a century. Dr. Costen became the first Mayor of Pocomoke City. The house currently serves as The Isaac Costen House Museum.

The Costen House was listed on the National Register of Historic Places in 1975.

The Isaac Costen House Museum
The Isaac Costen House Museum provides information on the Costen family and how people in the area lived during 1870–1920.  The grounds of the museum also includes The Hall-Walton Memorial Garden.

Footnotes

External links
Costen House Museum
, including photo from 1997, at Maryland Historical Trust
Costen House (Ocean City Vacation and Hotels Guide website)

Houses on the National Register of Historic Places in Maryland
Museums in Worcester County, Maryland
Historic house museums in Maryland
Biographical museums in Maryland
Italianate architecture in Maryland
Houses in Worcester County, Maryland
Houses completed in 1870
Pocomoke City, Maryland
National Register of Historic Places in Worcester County, Maryland